Cantua Creek may refer to:

 Cantua Creek (Fresno Slough tributary), a creek in California
 Cantua Creek, California, a census-designated place